This is a list of schools in the London Borough of Barking and Dagenham, England.

State-funded schools

Primary schools

Beam Primary School
Becontree Primary School
Dorothy Barley Infants' School
Dorothy Barley Junior Academy
Eastbrook School
Eastbury Community School
Eastbury Primary School
Five Elms Primary School
Furze Infants' School
Gascoigne Primary School
George Carey CE Primary School
Godwin Primary School
Goresbrook School
Grafton Primary School
Henry Green Primary School
Hunters Hall Primary School
The James Cambell Primary School
John Perry Primary School
The Leys Primary School
Manor Infants' School
Manor Junior School
Marsh Green Primary School
Monteagle Primary School
Northbury Primary School
Parsloes Primary School
Richard Alibon Primary School
Ripple Primary School
Riverside Primary School
Roding Primary School
Rose Lane Primary School
Rush Green Primary School
St Joseph's RC Primary School, Barking
St Joseph's RC Primary School, Dagenham
St Margaret's CE Primary School
St Peter's RC Primary School
The St Teresa RC Primary School
St Vincent's RC Primary School
Southwood Primary School
Thames View Infant School
Thames View Junior School
Thomas Arnold Primary School
Valence Primary School
Village Infants' School
Warren Junior School
William Bellamy Primary School
William Ford CE Junior School

source:

Secondary schools

 All Saints Catholic School
 Barking Abbey School 
 Dagenham Park Church of England School
 Eastbury Community School
 Elutec
 Goresbrook School
 Greatfields School
 Jo Richardson Community School
 Riverside School
 Robert Clack School
 The Sydney Russell School
 The Warren School

source:

Special and alternative schools
 Mayesbrook Park School
 Pathways School
 Riverside Bridge School
 Trinity School

Further education
Barking and Dagenham College
Adult College of Barking and Dagenham
Barking Learning Centre

Independent schools

Primary and preparatory schools
 Alamiyah School

Senior and all-through schools
 Frobel Independent School
 Lady Aisha Academy

Special and alternative schools
 Hopewell School
 Northstar New School

References

External links 
Barking and Dagenham Council website

 
Barking and Dagenham